This article contains a list of the most studied restriction enzymes whose names start with G to K inclusive.  It contains approximately 90 enzymes.

The following information is given:



Whole list navigation

Restriction enzymes

G

H

I

K

Notes

Biotechnology
Restriction enzyme cutting sites
Restriction enzymes